The 2012 World Outdoor Bowls Championship men's singles was held at the Lockleys Bowling Club in Adelaide, Australia. Some of the qualifying rounds were held at the nearby Holdfast Bowling Club in Glenelg North.

Leif Selby won the men's singles Gold.

Section tables

Pool 1

Pool 2

Finals

Results

References

Men